The 1965–66 Sussex County Football League season was the 41st in the history of Sussex County Football League a football competition in England.

Division One

Division One featured 14 clubs which competed in the division last season, along with two new clubs, promoted from Division Two:
Sidley United
Southwick

League table

Division Two

Division Two featured 16 clubs which competed in the division last season, along with two new clubs, relegated from Division One:
Hastings Rangers
Newhaven

League table

References

1965-66
S